Lucky Kids is a 1936 German romantic comedy film directed by Paul Martin and starring Lilian Harvey, Willy Fritsch, and Paul Kemp. It was shot at the Babelsberg Studios in Berlin. The film's sets were designed by the art director Erich Kettelhut.

Plot 

New York City in the 1930s: When the court reporter of the Morning Post gets drunk, his colleagues persuade the naive and unsuccessful newspaper poet Gil Taylor to write the court report instead. A poor girl is accused in the court, because she walked homeless through the city, and could be sentenced to a prison sentence. The romantic Gil has pity with the attractive girl and states that he is her fiancée, but the judge remains skeptical and arranges that the complete strangers get married right now in order to prove that they are really a couple. Gil and the girl agree.

The next day, every newspaper reports about the sensational marriage - except the Morning Post (because Gil forgot to write the report in his excitement). He is fired by the editor Manning and now married with a girl who rejects to reveal her true identity. The girl named Ann pretends that she is the abducted niece of the oil tycoon Jackson. After a series of humorous events, Gil finally gets his job back, also he and Ann finally fall in love.

Cast

Background 
The film was supposed to be a German take on the American genre of Screwball comedy film. The film was written by Curt Goetz, one of Germany's leading playwrights, and starred Lilian Harvey and Willy Fritsch (they made twelve films together and were considered the leading German film couple of the 1930s). The film proved to be very popular with critics and audiences. It is considered to be "one of the few comedies of German film, which do not only copy their role model, the American screwball comedy, but are also able to compete with their best representatives".

The song "Ich wollt‘ ich wär‘ ein Huhn" ("I wish I was a chicken") by Peter Kreuder, sung in the film, is still well known in Germany, also in the version sung by the Comedian Harmonists.

In popular culture 
In Quentin Tarantino's 2009 film Inglourious Basterds, Lilian Harvey's duet with Willy Fritsch from Lucky Kids, "Ich wollt' ich wär ein Huhn" can be heard playing on a phonograph in the basement scene "La Louisiane" as well as in the extended scene "Lunch With Goebbels", as Joseph Goebbels (Sylvester Groth) happily sings a portion of the song after deciding to hold a private screening of the film. After the screening, cinema owner Shosanna Dreyfus (Mélanie Laurent), under the alias "Emmanuelle Mimieux", comments on liking Lilian Harvey in the film—to which an irritated Goebbels angrily insists her name never be mentioned again in his presence (Harvey hated the Nazis and left Germany in 1939).

References

Bibliography

External links 
 

1936 films
1936 romantic comedy films
Films of Nazi Germany
German romantic comedy films
1930s German-language films
Films directed by Paul Martin
Films set in the United States
UFA GmbH films
Films shot at Babelsberg Studios
German black-and-white films
1930s German films